Bonner may refer to:

People
 Bonner (name)

Places
United States
 Bonner Springs, Kansas
 Bonner County, Idaho
 Bonners Ferry, Idaho
 Bonner-West Riverside, Montana
 Bonner, Nebraska
Australia
 Bonner, Australian Capital Territory, suburb of Canberra
 Division of Bonner, electoral district in Queensland
Other
 Bonnerveen, Dutch town, Netherlands
 Bonner Beach, a beach in the UK island of South Georgia

Other uses
 A resident of Bonn
 Junior Bonner, 1972 western movie
 Bonner Foundation, scholarship programme
 Bonner Platz (Munich U-Bahn), U-Bahn station
 Bonner SC, German football club
 Bonner Durchmusterung, star catalog
 Bonner spheres, used to determine the energy spectra of a neutron beam
 Bonners Ferry High School, high school in Bonners Ferry, Idaho
 Monsignor Bonner High School, Catholic secondary school in Drexel Hill, Pennsylvania
 Tom W. Bonner Prize in Nuclear Physics